This is a list of years in Libya.

20th century

21st century

See also
 Timeline of Benghazi
 Timeline of Tripoli

 
Libya history-related lists
Libya